The Best of After School 2009–2012: Korea Ver. (stylized as THE BEST OF AFTERSCHOOL 2009-2012 -Korea Ver.-) is the first greatest hits album by South Korean girl group After School. It was released on March 27, 2013 by Avex Trax along with the groups first live DVD,  After School First Japan Tour 2012 - Playgirlz-. The album contains all of After School's singles. The album also includes songs from A.S. Red & Blue and both "Happy Pledis" singles from 2010 and 2011. The limited edition version comes with a DVD featuring all of After School's music videos up to 2012.

Track listing

Chart performance

Oricon chart

Release history

References

After School (band) albums
2012 greatest hits albums
Hybe Corporation albums